Dunkerque – Les Moëres Airfield  is a recreational aerodrome in Les Moëres,  east of Dunkerque, Nord, France.

History 
Unfar from the then front line, the airfield served French and Belgian aviators in World War I.

Characteristics 
 Terrain elevation : -1 metre
 Runway : 07/25 grass, 638x50m
 Two hangars for club planes
 Ultralight aviation activity on adjacent terrain

Aeroclubs on the airfield 
 Dunkerque aeroclub
 Ultralight aviation club Les Cigognes, on a zone (200x35m) next to the main airfield

Events 
 Annual meeting in June.

Planes 
 2 Robin DR400 (F-GDEM and F-GMOA)
 2 Piper PA28 (F-GFJJ and F-GMSE)

External links 
 Aéroclub de Dunkerque
 Localization of the airfield on WikiMapia

References and notes

Airports in Hauts-de-France
Airport
Buildings and structures in Nord (French department)